Park Bo-gum (born June 16, 1993) is a South Korean actor.

Films

Television series

Television show

Web shows

Music video appearances

Hosting

References

South Korean filmographies